Edward "Ed" Stafman (born 1954) is an American attorney, rabbi, and former attorney serving as a member of the Montana House of Representatives from the 62nd district. Elected in November 2020, he assumed office on January 4, 2021.

Early life and education 
Stafman was born in Key West, Florida. He earned a Bachelor of Arts degree from Stony Brook University, a Master of Arts from Florida State University, and a Juris Doctor from the Florida State University College of Law.

Career 
Prior to entering politics, Stafman worked as a civil rights attorney in Tallahassee, Florida. During his legal career, Stafman specialized in death penalty cases. In 2000, Stafman was one of several lawyers who worked on Bush v. Gore litigation. Stafman was later ordained as a rabbi and moved to Bozeman, Montana with his wife and two children. He has since been affiliated with T'ruah. Stafman was elected to the Montana House of Representatives in November 2020 and assumed office on January 4, 2021. During his tenure in the House, Stafman has sponsored legislation to abolish the death penalty in Montana.

References 

Living people
1954 births
People from Key West, Florida
Stony Brook University alumni
Florida State University alumni
Florida State University College of Law alumni
People from Tallahassee, Florida
Florida lawyers
Democratic Party members of the Montana House of Representatives
American rabbis
People from Bozeman, Montana
21st-century American Jews